Carola Uilenhoed (born 10 October 1984 in The Hague) is a Dutch judoka.

Achievements

External links
 
 
 Videos of Carola Uilenhoed in action at JudoVision.org

1984 births
Living people
Dutch female judoka
Judoka at the 2008 Summer Olympics
Olympic judoka of the Netherlands
Sportspeople from The Hague
21st-century Dutch women